The men's 400 metres hurdles competition at the 1968 Summer Olympics in Mexico City, Mexico took place on October 13–15 at the Estadio Olímpico Universitario. There were 30 competitors from 24 nations. The maximum number of athletes per nation had been set at 3 since the 1930 Olympic Congress. The event was won by David Hemery of Great Britain, the nation's first victory in the men's 400 metres hurdles since 1928 and second overall—second-most after the United States' 11. The win broke a streak of 6 consecutive American victories. Further, the United States failed to medal in the event for the first time ever; in all 13 previous times the event was held, the American team had at least a silver medalist. Great Britain was the first nation other than the United States to have two medalists in the event in the same Games, as John Sherwood took bronze. Gerhard Hennige of West Germany was the first German hurdler to earn a medal in the event, finishing between the two Britons with silver.

Background

This was the 14th time the event was held. It had been introduced along with the men's 200 metres hurdles in 1900, with the 200 being dropped after 1904 and the 400 being held through 1908 before being left off the 1912 programme. However, when the Olympics returned in 1920 after World War I, the men's 400 metres hurdles was back and would continue to be contested at every Games thereafter.

Four of the eight finalists from the 1964 Games returned: silver medalist John Cooper of Great Britain, fourth-place finisher Gary Knoke of Australia, sixth-place finisher Roberto Frinolli of Italy, and eighth-place finisher Wilfried Geeroms of Belgium. Once again, the American team (which had won the last six gold medals in the event) was favored. Geoff Vanderstock had broken the world record at the U.S. trials; Ron Whitney had won the AAU title in 1967 and 1968.

Cuba, Ghana, and Libya each made their debut in the event; West Germany competed separately for the first time. The United States made its 14th appearance, the only nation to have competed at every edition of the event to that point.

Summary

In the final, David Hemery took the race out hard. By the final straightaway he had an ever-growing lead over the world record holder Geoff Vanderstock. Hemery continued to pour it on, taking seven tenths of a second out of the world record, a huge improvement. Vanderstock struggled between the final barrier and the finish line, his 2-metre advantage over field evaporated. Gerhard Hennige, then John Sherwood edged past him at the line.

Competition format

The competition used the three-round format used every Games since 1908 (except the four-round competition in 1952): quarterfinals, semifinals, and a final. Ten sets of hurdles were set on the course. The hurdles were 3 feet (91.5 centimetres) tall and were placed 35 metres apart beginning 45 metres from the starting line, resulting in a 40 metres home stretch after the last hurdle. The 400 metres track was standard.

There were 4 quarterfinal heats with 8 athletes each (before two withdrawals left one heat with only 6 men). The top 4 men in each quarterfinal advanced to the semifinals. The 16 semifinalists were divided into 2 semifinals of 8 athletes each, with the top 4 in each semifinal advancing to the 8-man final.

Records

Prior to the competition, the existing world and Olympic records were as follows.

Ron Whitney set a new Olympic record of 49.0 seconds in the third quarterfinal. Three men (Gerhard Hennige, John Sherwood, and Geoff Vanderstock matched that time in the final, but they were all nearly a full second behind the winner: Dave Hemery, who shattered the world record with a 48.1 seconds performance.

Schedule

All times are Central Standard Time (UTC-6)

Results

Quarterfinals

Quarterfinal 1

Quarterfinal 2

Quarterfinal 3

Quarterfinal 4

Semifinals

Semifinal 1

Semifinal 2

Final

Results summary

References

External links
 Official Olympic Report, la84foundation.org. Retrieved August 13, 2012.

Athletics at the 1968 Summer Olympics
400 metres hurdles at the Olympics
Men's events at the 1968 Summer Olympics